Haile Malakot (1824 – 9 November 1855) was Negus of Shewa, a historical region of Ethiopia, from 12 October 1847 until his death. He was the oldest son of Negus Sahle Selassie an important Amhara noblemen and his wife Woizero Bezabish Wolde.

Lineage and early life
Of Amhara royal descent. Haile Melekot is the oldest son of the King of Shewa Sahle Selassie and Woizero Bezabish Wolde. Haile Melekot had 5 full siblings, 4 sisters and one brother Sayfu Sahle Selassie who is three or four years younger. He had numerous half-siblings as his father sired other children by his numerous concubines, among them his half-brothers Haile Mikael Sahle Selassie and Darge Sahle Selassie.

During William Cornwallis Harris diplomatic mission to Sahle Selassie's court, both Haile Melekot and Sayfu stayed at different monasteries, pursuing a traditional church education. Each was attended by a eunuch, a nurse, and guardians, whose task was to supervise and discipline. In addition to their academic studies, the boys were trained in horsemanship and the various arts of war. They followed a rigorous timetable, studying, practising with shield and spear, attending church service, fasting, and praying.

Descendants
Haile Melekot's first wife was probably a palace servant by the name Ejigayehu whom he married in 1844 in order to legitimize their one child, baptised Sahle Mariam, was renamed Menelik by Negus Sahle Selassie. Her background is disputed; some believe she was of Gurage origin, others insist that she was among the ladies who were brought from the Imperial court at Gondar to Ankober to instruct the royal women of Shewa on court etiquette so that the Shewan branch of the dynasty could adopt the same court practices as the elder Gondar branch. He divorced Ejigayehu in less than a year, and in May 1845 he married his second wife, Woizero Tideneqialesh, who was a former wife of a court official.

Rise to power
Haile Melekot was known as Lij Besha Warad before he became king of Shewa in 1847. It was well known that Sahle Selassie favored his younger son, Sayfu Sahle Selassie, and it was widely rumored that he would make his younger son his heir. However, Sahle Selassie publicly announced that his oldest son Haile Melekot would inherit the kingdom, had Sayfu swear to abide by this decision, and although mortally ill shortly before his death travelled to Debre Berhan where he asked his vassal lords to remain loyal to Haile Melekot.

Nonetheless, in Mordechai Abir's words, Sahle Selassie's death "was a signal for a blood bath which surpassed anything that ever occurred in the annals of Showa." The Abichu Oromo rose in open revolt, attempting to recover control of the district of Tegulet and came close to capturing the capital of Ankober. Only the loyalty of some of the other Oromo chiefs and the Shewan supply of firearms saved the capital. Haile Melekot afterwards managed to persuade the meet with him at Angolalla, where he persuaded them to end their revolt. By the beginning of 1848, he was firmly in control of his kingdom, and even organized a campaign against the Arsi Oromo, who had been raiding the south-western parts of Shewa for years.

Reign
Harold G. Marcus notes that "little is known or remembered of the reign of Sahle Selassie's son, except for its end." While he is likely correct in stating that this lack of information "leads one to believe that his reign was undistinguished", one brief letter of Haile Melekot survives, undated but written in the spring of 1849 and addressed to "Victoria, Queen of the Ferangi" – i.e. the Europeans. According to Sven Rubenson, it was delivered by an Ethiopian pilgrim to the British consul at Cairo, who was on his way to Jerusalem; the pilgrim also informed the consul that a gift consisting of 26 elephant tusks and 31 rhinoceros horns were en route to the British at Aden. Although it was agreed that the pilgrim would stop on his return travel to pick up the British response, he was never seen again.

In this letter, Haile Melekot refers to the friendship between the United Kingdom and Shewa, asks why they did not send a servant on his father's death to bring condolences and for 1,500 Thalers, with a verbal message by the courier asking for skilled workmen. Misunderstanding the intent of this letter (and not for the last time the British government misunderstood Ethiopian customs), Lord Palmerston responded on 4 July 1849 that Shewa lay too far away to send any workmen "and, moreover, the workmen in her dominions are at present much employed." With this letter a chest containing 300 sovereigns was sent; this gift was returned with a second letter containing the accusation that the coins were not made of gold but brass, and concluding, "Even if our friendship is gone, let there not be enmity between us."

Rubenson interprets this communication as evidence of Shewan "aloofness and suspicion" of European attention. He notes that the letter was sent not under the royal name of Haile Melekot, but as "Basad Wirad", the name he used before his coronation, and was most familiar to the Europeans visiting Shewa in his father's time knew him. The ruler, or at least his secretary, was unclear which country Victoria was queen over. As for the return of the coins, Rubenson believes "it is more likely that the King was prevented from accepting the gift by the same anti-European forces that had compelled Krapf and Harris to give up Shewa. Whatever the reason, the incident shows how difficult it was to create confidence and establish anythiing resembling ordinary diplomatic relations."

Inevitably, Haile Melekot's semi-independent kingdom (the Emperor of Ethiopia in Gondar was still nominally the liege lord of the King of Shewa) came to the attention of Tewodros II, a regional lord of Gondar, who successfully concluding the process of defeating the remaining local rulers (princes) of Ethiopia and reuniting Ethiopia. Haile Melekot allied himself with the Oromo in the province Wollo, which lay between him and Tewodros, but as Abir notes, he "was not made of the same stuff his father was, and could not provide the same inspiring leadership which had made Showa strong in the past." The Shewan army failed to provide any effective help to the Oromo leaders in Wollo, and with an army of 50,000 men, Tewodros crushed his divided opposition. After a pause for the rainy season, Tewodros then entered northern Shewa in 1855.

By this point Haile Melekot was discouraged and gravely sick. His brother Seyfe, dissatisfied with his indecision, led the army south from Wollo to Menz then to Tegulet, abandoning Haile Melekot. The local governors were no match for the Emperor, and either were defeated or (like the governor of Efrata) went over to Tewodros' side. Rebellious Oromo burned Angolalla. The Negus of Shewa was horrified to learn that his mother Bezabish and his grandmother Zenebework (respectively widow and mother of the late Sahle Selassie) had crossed to the camp of Tewodros II and paid him homage in exchange for a guarantee that their personal lands would not be touched. A despondent Haile Melekot made a few skirmishes against Tewodros' forces, then destroyed his food stores and his capital of Ankober to keep it out of Tewodros' hands. He died of his illness in the town of Atakelt, and was hastily buried at Debre Gage in Tara.

A handful of Shewan nobles fought on, until a final battle in Bulga, where they were defeated by a detachment of Tewodros' troops under Ras Ingida. Accepting that further resistance was not possible, they delivered Menelik, the son and heir of Haile Melekot, to Tewodros. Emperor Tewodros appointed Haile Melekot's brother Haile Mikael governor, and the independence of Shewa came to an end.

Aftermath 
In an interesting postscript, Tewodros II is said to have disbelieved that Haile Melekot was really dead and demanded that his body be disinterred. When he saw the body of the dead king, the Emperor is said to have wept for him, saying it was a shame that illness should deny a brave man such as the King of Shewa, the honor of falling in battle. He ordered that Haile Melekot be re-buried with all the pomp and ceremony due to a king.

See also
List of rulers of Shewa

Notes

References 

1824 births
1855 deaths
Rulers of Shewa
19th-century Ethiopian people